The 2020–21 Professional Football League was the third highest division in Russian football. The Professional Football League is geographically divided into 4 groups.
The winners of each zone are automatically promoted into the National Football League. The bottom finishers of each zone lose professional status and are relegated into the Amateur Football League.

Group 1

Standings

Top goalscorers

Group 2

Standings

Group 3

Standings

Group 4

Standings

References

2020-21
3
Rus